Leandro Santoro (born 11 June 1976) is an Argentine political scientist, professor and politician, currently serving as a National Deputy since 2021. Santoro previously served as a member of the Buenos Aires City Legislature from 2017 to 2021. 

Though his political career began in the Radical Civic Union (UCR), since 2015 Santoro has been aligned with the National Alfonsinist Movement, a faction of the UCR that broke away with the party and backed the Front for Victory. In the Chamber of Deputies, he sits in the Frente de Todos parliamentary bloc.

Early life and career
Santoro was born on 11 June 1976 in the Buenos Aires neighbourhood of Caballito. He was raised by a single mother and attended the Colegio San Francisco de Sales, a Catholic boys' school. Starting at age 13, he joined the Radical Civic Union (UCR) inspired by his admiration of then-president Raúl Alfonsín. In time, Santoro would become a leader in the Juventud Radical, the UCR's youth wing. 

In 1999, Santoro and other members of his local UCR committee camped outside the Hospital Italiano, where Alfonsín had been hospitalised following a potentially lethal accident, for 40 days. The event helped forge a deeper connection between Alfonsín and Santoro. He formed part of Los Irrompibles, an alfonsinist group within the UCR founded by Jesús Rodríguez.

Santoro studied political science at the University of Buenos Aires, and later taught courses at the university's UBA XXI programme.

Political career
Following Alfonsín's death in 2009, Santoro and other alfonsinists started getting closer to the Front for Victory, which then supported the government of Cristina Fernández de Kirchner. In 2014, upon Fernández de Kirchner's invitation, he formed part of the state delegation that visited Pope Francis in the Vatican. In 2015, he joined Leopoldo Moreau in breaking away from the UCR and founding the pro-Kirchner National Alfonsinist Movement. That year, he was Mariano Recalde's running mate for Chief of Government of Buenos Aires in the Front for Victory list: the ticket received 21.91% of the vote and landed third.

In 2017, Santoro was elected to the Buenos Aires City Legislature as the fourth candidate in the Unidad Porteña list, which received 21.26% of the vote. Following the 2019 general election, he joined the Frente de Todos and sat in the unified FDT bloc in the Legislature.

In the 2021 legislative election, Santoro ran for a seat in the Chamber of Deputies as the first candidate in the Frente de Todos list in Buenos Aires. With 25.06% of the vote, the FDT was the second-most voted alliance in the city, enough for Santoro to make it past the D'Hondt cut and be elected, alongside Gisela Marziotta and Carlos Heller. He was sworn in on 4 December 2021, and began his mandate on 10 December 2021.

Personal life
Santoro was married to Cecilia Moreau, a fellow politician and daughter of the prominent political leader (and Santoro's former political mentor) Leopoldo Moreau. Santoro and Moreau have a daughter. Since 2021, Santoro has sat in the Chamber of Deputies alongside both Moreaus. 

Sports-wise, he is a supporter of San Lorenzo de Almagro.

Electoral history

Executive

Legislative

References

External links

Profile on the official website of the Chamber of Deputies (in Spanish)

Living people
1976 births
Politicians from Buenos Aires
Radical Civic Union politicians
Members of the Buenos Aires City Legislature
Members of the Argentine Chamber of Deputies elected in Buenos Aires
21st-century Argentine politicians
University of Buenos Aires alumni
Academic staff of the University of Buenos Aires